The South African cricket team toured New Zealand during February to March 2017 to play three Test matches, five One Day Internationals (ODIs) and one Twenty20 International (T20I) match. In January 2017 the current South African Test captain AB de Villiers said he would be unavailable for selection for this series. The fourth ODI, which was originally scheduled to be played at McLean Park, Napier, was moved to Seddon Park, Hamilton. This was due to need for urgent work on the venue's turf, drainage and irrigation system.

South Africa won the one-off T20I match by 78 runs, and the five-match ODI series 3–2, reclaiming the number one spot in the ODI ranking. It was South Africa's seventh consecutive win in a bilateral ODI series, ending New Zealand's eighth successive bilateral ODI series winning streak at home. South Africa won the Test series 1–0, with the first and third Tests ending as draws, leading to the confirmation of South Africa as the number two Test ranked nation by the cut-off date of 1 April 2017 behind India.

Squads

Martin Guptill was ruled out of New Zealand's limited-overs squads due to injury. Glenn Phillips replaced him for the T20I match and Dean Brownlie replaced him for the ODI matches. However, ahead of the fourth ODI, Guptill and Jeetan Patel were added to the ODI squad and Matt Henry was released. However, ahead of the fifth ODI, Matt Henry was added back to the ODI squad. Ross Taylor was ruled out of the New Zealand squad for the 2nd Test due to calf injury sustained during the 1st Test. Neil Broom was named as his replacement. Matt Henry was also included in the Test squad. Dane Piedt was added to South Africa's squad ahead of the second Test. With Piedt added to South Africa's squad, Chris Morris was released from the team. Trent Boult was ruled out of New Zealand's squad for the 2nd Test due to leg injury sustained during the 1st Test. Duanne Olivier was released from South Africa's squad ahead of the third Test. Tim Southee was ruled out of the final Test with a hamstring injury.

Tour match

T20I series

Only T20I

ODI series

1st ODI

2nd ODI

3rd ODI

4th ODI

5th ODI

Test series

1st Test

2nd Test

3rd Test

References

External links
 Series home at ESPN Cricinfo

2017 in New Zealand cricket
2017 in South African cricket
International cricket competitions in 2016–17
South African cricket tours of New Zealand